St. James Community School is a co-educational pre-school, grade school, and high school in Antipolo, Philippines.

History
St. James Community School is a non-sectarian institution of learning. It was founded in 1986 by Mr. & Mrs. Jaime L. Baltao. The school was family-incorporated on January 17, 1986. In 1995, the owner of the school turned over management duties to Mrs. Charito Zapanta-Espiritu.

The institution is recognized by the Department of Education. It is a member of the City of Antipolo Private School and Administrator Association (CAPSAA), the Rizal Private Pre- Elementary and Elementary School Association (RIPPESA), the Rizal Private Secondary School Association(RIPSSA), the Philippine Taekwondo Association,(PTA), and Milo Little Olympics.

Schools in Antipolo
1986 establishments in the Philippines
Educational institutions established in 1986